Alessandro Viana da Silva (born August 10, 1982), known as Alessandro, is a Brazilian footballer.

Biography
Born in Recife, Brazil, he has previously played for Brazilian clubs sides Internacional Porto Alegre, ADAP and Angra dos Reis. Alessandro is a lightning-quick left-back who possesses a fine technique and an attacking attitude to the position. He was spotted in Brazil by Melbourne Victory coach Ernie Merrick. Merrick likened him to legendary Brazilian fullback Roberto Carlos because of his pacy runs down the flank and quality crosses.

A crowd favourite at Melbourne Victory, Alessandro was used as a left wing-back during the 2006-07 A-League season. Negotiations with the Melbourne-based club for an extension to his contract broke down in early 2007, and the player returned to Brazil, joining Atlético Paranaense.

References

External links
Melbourne Victory player profile
 Brazilians: going, going, gone

1982 births
Living people
Brazilian footballers
Brazilian expatriate footballers
Association football defenders
América Futebol Clube (SP) players
Sport Club Internacional players
Melbourne Victory FC players
Club Athletico Paranaense players
Esporte Clube Vitória players
Neftçi PFK players
A-League Men players
Expatriate soccer players in Australia
Expatriate footballers in Azerbaijan
People from Jaboatão dos Guararapes
Sportspeople from Pernambuco